Elisée Reverchon (1834, Oullins, near Lyon – 1914, Miribel in the department of Ain) was a French botanical collector.  His brother, Julien Reverchon (1837-1905), was also involved in the field of botany.

A resident of Bollène (department Vaucluse), he engaged himself in botanical missions to southeastern France (from 1867 to 1877), Corsica (1878-1880), Sardinia (1881–82) and Algeria (1881–82). He also conducted botanical investigations in Spain from 1887 and 1906 that are considered to be his most important work. During his later years, he lived in Lyon.

Some plants with the specific epithet of reverchonii are named in his honor.

Books written about Elisée Reverchon 
 Excursions botaniques de M. Elisée Reverchon, Le Mans : Institut de bibliographie, (1905-1907) by Joseph Hervier.
 La Sierra de Cazorla et les Excursions d'Elisée Reverchon, Genève : Société botanique de Genève, (1929) by C C Lacaita.

References 

1835 births
1914 deaths
19th-century French botanists
People from Ain
20th-century French botanists